Richard Willis may refer to:

Sir Richard Willis, 1st Baronet (1614–1690), Royalist officer during the English Civil War
Richard Willis (bishop) (1664–1734), English bishop
Richard Storrs Willis (1819–1900), American composer, music critic and journal editor
Richard Willis (Medal of Honor) (1826–1896), U.S. Navy sailor and Medal of Honor recipient during the American Civil War
Richard Gardiner Willis (1865–1929), politician in Manitoba, Canada
Richard Raymond Willis (1876–1966), English recipient of the Victoria Cross
Richard Willis (publicist and agent) (1876–1945)
Richard Willis (cricketer) (died 1877), English cricketer
Richard H. Willis, American economist
Richard Willis (Royal Navy officer) (1755–1829)
Richard Willis (actor) (born 1958), formerly married to June Page and Kate O'Mara